The Purse Snatcher or  De Tasjesdief  is a 1995 Dutch film directed by Maria Peters.

Cast
Olivier Tuinier	... 	Alex van Zuilen
Aus Greidanus Jr.	... 	Lucos
Micha Hulshof	... 	Evert
Myranda Jongeling	... 	Moeder van Alex
Jaap Spijkers	... 	Vader van Alex
Ingeborg Uyt den Boogaard	... 	Roos
Freark Smink	... 	Stiefvader Ronnie
Renée Fokker	... 	Moeder Evert en Lucos
Sophie van Pelt	... 	Evelien
Flip van Duyn	... 	Vader Evelien
Sheila Lever	... 	Moeder Evelien
Ann Hasekamp	... 	Blinde Vrouw
Cees Groot	... 	Leraar
Marjan Luif	... 	Buurvrouw Roos
Rob van de Meeberg	... 	Huisarts

References

External links 
 

Dutch thriller drama films
1995 films
1990s Dutch-language films